The name Bolaven has been used for four tropical cyclones in the western Pacific Ocean. The name, contributed by Laos, refers to the Bolaven Plateau, located in the southern part of the country.

 Severe Tropical Storm Bolaven (2000) (T0006, 11W, Huaning) – crossed the Ryūkyū Islands and brushed southern Japan.
 Severe Tropical Storm Bolaven (2005) (T0523, 24W, Pepeng) – hit the Philippines as a tropical storm.
 Typhoon Bolaven (2012) (T1215, 16W, Julian) – hit Korea and Okinawa.
 Tropical Storm Bolaven (2018) (T1801, 01W, Agaton) – traversed the Philippines and then dissipated east of Vietnam.

Pacific typhoon set index articles